In Fijian mythology (specifically: Fiji), Cibaciba and Drakulu are the two cave entrances to the underworld (see Degei).

References 

Afterlife places
Fijian mythology